María Conchita is the debut studio album recorded by Cuban-Venezuelan performer María Conchita Alonso. It was released by A&M Records in 1984, and produced by Juan Carlos Calderón. The album was nominated for a Grammy Award for Best Latin Pop Performance in the 27th Annual Grammy Awards on February 26, 1985.

Track listing
All tracks written by Juan Carlos Calderón, except "La Loca", written by Las Diego.

References

1984 albums
Albums produced by Juan Carlos Calderón
A&M Records albums
María Conchita Alonso albums
Spanish-language albums